Kymenlaakson Sähkö Stadion (formerly Saviniemen Jalkapallostadion and Anjalankosken Jalkapallostadion) is a multi-use stadium in Kouvola, Finland.  It is currently used mostly for football matches and is the home stadium of MYPA.  The stadium holds 4,167 and was built in 1995. The stadium has hosted several Europa League qualifying matches, including three in the 2010–11 tournament when MYPA were eliminated in the 3rd qualifying round by Romanian Club Timișoara.

References

 https://web.archive.org/web/20120418223513/http://www.mypa.fi/ottelut/stadion/
 http://www.football-lineups.com/stadium/406/Games/

Football venues in Finland
Sports venues completed in 1995
Buildings and structures in Kouvola
Buildings and structures in Kymenlaakso